Cristóbal Colón is the fifth and last ship of the  of air defence frigates entering service with the Spanish Navy. The ship is named after Christopher Columbus, the Genoese explorer that claimed the discovery of America in the name of the Crown of Castile. It is the most modern ship of the Spanish Navy.

Operational history
Cristóbal Colón was ordered on 20 May 2005 and construction started in the Ferrol shipyards on 29 June 2007. The ship was launched on 4 November 2010 and commissioned on 23 October 2012. The frigate was sponsored by the Infanta Margarita, Duchess of Soria.

On 9 February 2013, it sailed from its base in Ferrol, in its first navigation out of the Galician waters to set sail for the naval base of Rota, where it arrived on 11 February. It began a process of inspection, certification and naval training that ended on the 15 February. On 14 February a Sikorsky SH-3 made the first landing on its flight deck. On 24 February 2014, she sailed from her base in Ferrol to join the Atalanta anti-piracy operation in Indian waters.

On 16 March 2014 she relieved Álvaro de Bazán in Djibouti. While in port an accidental firing of the 127-mm cannon occurred. The shell fell to the sea floor after flying over a hotel and a mosque. Spanish diplomatic authorities had to apologize.

On 26 and 27 June 2014, the frigate escorted the cruiser USS Vella Gulf against conventional aerial threat in Vella Gulf's passage through the Mediterranean, as the US Navy was configuring a combat system to intercept ballistic targets outside the Earth's atmosphere.

On 11 July 2014 she returned to her base in Ferrol. The other four ships of the class were also at Ferrol, so that for the first time, the five frigates of the class made a joint training exercise as part of the 31st Escort Squadron.

In mid-July 2016 Cristóbal Colón certified her combat system in Norfolk, US with the American destroyer USS Arleigh Burke, after which she made a stopover in Halifax, Canada to support Navantia's commercial options in a contest for the construction of fifteen frigates. The ship arrived at her base in Ferrol on 2 August 2016.

On 9 January 2017, F105 sailed from her base in Ferrol to Australia, arriving on  20 February 2017. On 20 and 21 January 2017, a stopover took place in the Saudi port of Yeda, where the ship received a delegation from the Saudi Navy. 

On 24 June 2017, the frigate finished its deployment in Australia and began its return to base. After stopping in Papeete, French Polynesia and Callao, Peru it arrived back to Ferrol in August. The ship participated in exercise UNITAS 2017 between July 13 and 26.

Differences from the rest of the class
The design of the Cristóbal Colón incorporates several improvements with respect to the original design of the class. It incorporates new Bravo 16V engines that increase its maximum speed and a bow thruster of 850 kW for operations in port. In weaponry and combat systems, two 25mm Mk 38 guns are added for close defense, a new electronic and submarine warfare control system, Aries surface surveillance radar, SPY-1 radar improvements, and improvements in communications and control systems. F105 can also operate with NH 90 helicopters by expanding the hangar and flight deck.

See also
 F110-class frigate
 Spanish frigate Blas de Lezo

References

Frigates
Frigates of the Spanish Navy
Ships built in Ferrol, Spain
2010 ships